Kunčina is a municipality and village in Svitavy District in the Pardubice Region of the Czech Republic. It has about 1,400 inhabitants.

Administrative parts
The village of Nová Ves is an administrative part of Kunčina.

References

Villages in Svitavy District